Farm Weekly is a newspaper published by Australian Community Media. Founded in 1974 as Elders Weekly, it was renamed Farm Weekly in 1993. It focuses on the agriculture industry in Western Australia. It was published by Fairfax Media until sold to Australian Community Media in 2019.

References

Newspapers published in Perth, Western Australia
Weekly newspapers published in Australia
Publications established in 1974
1974 establishments in Australia